Knights of the Temple II is an open-world action-adventure game, developed by Cauldron and published by Playlogic Entertainment. It is the sequel to Knights of the Temple: Infernal Crusade.

Plot 
Twenty years after Paul closed the Gate to Hell and defeated the evil Bishop, during the time then, he and Adelle fell in love but she was  corrupted by a demon from Hell during his fight with the evil bishop. He then realises that his visions tell him about something evil that is coming, so he sets out on a journey to find the answers to his questions. His travels lead him to the Byzantine city of Sirmium, the pirate city Ylgar and the Saracen port Yusra.

Paul must find three artifacts - The Eye, The Weapon and The Rune to close the Gate to Hell. Each artifact is hidden in a different city. On his journey he must fight Undead, Daemonic creatures, Saracen armies, and even his own kind, before his final battle with the Devil himself. Only through blood can he meet his fate at the very doorstep to Hell.

The game has 2 endings depending on the actions of the player (Both endings take place after the Devil was banished through the portal). The bad ending sees Paul possessed by the Devil due to his bad deeds while alive,the Devil being able to continue his plans without anyone left to stop him. The good/normal ending sees Paul accepting his death to seal the Devil once again and save the world .

Gameplay 
this game includes side quests and is an open world game

Reception 
Knights of the Temple II received mixed reviews according to video game review aggregator Metacritic.

Reviews
PC Games (Germany)
PC Action (Germany)
JeuxVideoPC.com
Worth Playing
4Players.de
Jeuxvideo.com
Jeuxvideo.com
Boomtown
Jeuxvideo.com
Fragland.net
Eurogamer.net
GameSpot
Play.tm

References 

2005 video games
Video games developed in Slovakia
Video game sequels
PlayStation 2 games
Windows games
Video games set in the Middle Ages
Video games set in the Byzantine Empire
Xbox games
Playlogic Entertainment games
TDK Mediactive games
Single-player video games